Miklos Sandor Dora III (August 11, 1934 – January 3, 2002), known professionally as Miki Dora was a noted surfer of the 1950s and 1960s in Malibu, California.

Dora received numerous nicknames and aliases during his life, including "Mickey Dora," "The Black Knight," "the Gypsy darling ," "Malibu Mickey," "Kung'Bu," "the Fiasco Kid," "El Taquache," and "Da Cat."

Life
Dora was introduced to surfing by his father, Miklos, in the late 1930s. His stepfather Gard Chapin was also a "surf pioneer . . . a roughneck rebel who never fit into polite society." Chapin's obsessions with surfboard design brought Dora into contact with California industrial designers including visits to the studio of Charles and Ray Eames.

Dora's signature surfboard, released in 1966, became the biggest selling surfboard in history, and again on its re-release 25 years later. The visibility of surfers such as Dora as well as the impact of the book Gidget meant many new surfers were starting to surf and thus crowding out existing surfers such as Dora. This sudden influx of surfers caused Dora to decry the masses both in person and in advertisements for his surfboards, one of which features Dora being crucified on two of his boards.

He decided to leave the U.S. in 1970 and lived around the world spending a majority of his time in France and South Africa. After he returned to the US from France in 1981, he was subsequently arrested by the FBI for violating his parole by leaving the country in 1975 after pleading guilty to writing a bad check for the purchase of ski equipment. While serving time for that, he was sentenced to six months in federal prison after a Denver grand jury indicted him for credit card fraud in 1982.

Despite his perceived mistrust towards the commercialization of surfing, Dora did enter into a profit sharing arrangement with Greg Noll to release a limited number of Miki Dora "da cat" surfboards, during which time he created magazine advertisements promoting the boards.

He died at his father's home in Montecito, California, on January 3, 2002, at age 67 from pancreatic cancer.

Accusations of racism 
Surfing books often focus only on Dora's heroic and charismatic side.  Dora was also known for being surly and standoffish.  He was also referred to as a bigot and a white supremacist.  Notably, he painted a swastika on his surfboard at least once.  Dora's idea of "localism" - that the waves belonged to those who grew up near them, and outsiders deserved violence to be kept away - has also been criticized as terrible and de facto racist.

Nat Young, world surfing champion in 1966 and 1970, knew Dora. As Young told an interviewer: “Dora's take is push the black man under. He's a supreme racist, always has been. Dora moved to South Africa in the 1970s and was an ardent supporter of the apartheid. When I was younger, I believed it was all just in mirth, that he was just jivin’ it all; but no, he believes absolutely in white supremacy.”

Filmography 
Feature Films

Popular media
 In 2010,the band Sol Driven Train released their song "Miki Dora" featured on their album Believe.
 In 2013, Leroy Fail recorded the song "Dora Lives". 
 In 2014, Anderson .Paak included the track "Miki Doralude" on his album Venice. The track is an audio clip of Miki Dora talking taken from the 1990 documentary film Surfers: The Movie.
 In 2018, Amen Dunes named a song "Miki Dora" on their album Freedom.

References

External links

MikiDora.com

1934 births
2002 deaths
American surfers
Deaths from cancer in California
Deaths from pancreatic cancer
Sportspeople from Budapest